Alexander Mirto Frangipani was a Roman Catholic prelate who served as Bishop of Caiazzo (1529–1537).

Biography
On 28 Jun 1529, Alexander Mirto Frangipani was appointed during the papacy of Pope Clement VII as Bishop of Caiazzo. He served as Bishop of Caiazzo until his resignation on 10 Jul 1537.

References

External links and additional sources
 (for Chronology of Bishops) 
 (for Chronology of Bishops)  

16th-century Italian Roman Catholic bishops
Bishops appointed by Pope Clement VII